Ashokan Bridge (also known as the Turnwood Bridge or New Paltz Campus Bridge) is a wooden covered bridge over Esopus Creek on the grounds of the Ashokan Center, in Ulster County. It was built in 1885, and is a single span, gable roofed, covered timber bridge. It measures 72 feet, 6 inches, long and 16 feet, 4 inches, wide.  It was originally located at Turnwood and moved to its present location in 1939.  It is situated in the Ashokan Center, which was formerly the Ashokan Field Campus of the State University of New York at New Paltz.

It was added to the National Register of Historic Places in 2000.

It is one of 29 covered bridges in New York State.

References

External links
 Ashokan / Turnwood Bridge, at New York State Covered Bridge Society

State University of New York at New Paltz
Bridges in Ulster County, New York
Covered bridges on the National Register of Historic Places in New York (state)
National Register of Historic Places in Ulster County, New York
Bridges completed in 1885
1885 establishments in New York (state)
Road bridges on the National Register of Historic Places in New York (state)
Wooden bridges in New York (state)